Boker may refer to:

Surname (Boker)

 George Henry Boker (1823-1890), an American poet, playwright, and diplomat
 John G. Boker, creator of Boker’s Bitters (1828)
 John Robert Boker, Jr. (1913-2003), an award-winning philatelist
 Nava Boker (1970), an Israeli politician and journalist
 Zeev Boker, an Israeli Ambassador

Place

 Sde Boker, a kibbutz in Israel

Company

 Böker, a German cutlery company